Crooked Tree is the third studio album by American bluegrass singer and musician Molly Tuttle. Released on April 1, 2022, it is Tuttle's first album for Nonesuch Records and the first to feature her band Golden Highway, who receive star billing. The album was co-produced by Tuttle and dobro player Jerry Douglas and includes collaborations with Margo Price, Billy Strings, Old Crow Medicine Show, Sierra Hull, Dan Tyminski and Gillian Welch. It was preceded by the single "She'll Change", which was released on November 17, 2021.

The album received positive reviews from critics and won the Grammy Award for Best Bluegrass Album at the 65th Annual Grammy Awards and also contributed towards Tuttle being nominated for the all-genre Grammy Award for Best New Artist. Tuttle also received five nominations at the 2022 International Bluegrass Music Awards based on the strength of the album, winning Female Vocalist of the Year. In addition, it won Album of the Year at the 2023 International Folk Music Awards.

Background
The album was announced on January 20, 2022. It was recorded live at Oceanway Studios in Nashville, Tennessee and was inspired by Tuttle's father, a music teacher and multi-instrumentalist who provides backing vocals on the closing track, and her grandfather, a banjo player. Of the album's creation, Tuttle stated: “Once I started writing, everything flowed so easily: sometimes I’ve felt an internal pressure to come up with a sound no one’s heard before, but this time my intention was just to make an album that reflected the music that’s been passed down through generations in my family. I found a way to do that while writing songs that feel true to who I am, and it really helped me to grow as a songwriter.”

Margo Price was chosen to appear on the track "Flatland Girl" because she and Tuttle had a similar childhood, having both grown up on farms. Tuttle wanted a "Midwestern girl" to accompany her on the song and learned about Price's family farm after reading an interview. Old Crow Medicine Show feature on the song "Big Backyard", which marks the second time Tuttle has collaborated with the band after frontman Ketch Secor appeared on "Olympia, WA", a song on her previous album. Tuttle and Secor co-wrote the song together and she explained that “We wrote it with them in mind, and then reworked the lyrics to make it fit my voice”. In a press release about the song, Tuttle explained that it was inspired by Woody Guthrie, noting “I wish that Woody Guthrie were still around. I’d love to hear the songs he would write about the crazy world we’re living in today. But since he’s not, Ketch Secor and I wrote the best Woody Guthrie song we could think of.” Regarding the album's title track, Tuttle explained: “I wrote that song with my friend Melody Walker. We had seen a quote by Tom Waits. It kind of said like, when they chop down the trees in a forest, the crooked trees are the ones left standing.”

Tuttle and Golden Highway promoted the album by performing "Crooked Tree", "She'll Change" and "Over the Line" on CBS Saturday Morning on April 9, 2022.

The deluxe version of the album was released on December 2, 2022 and featured four bonus tracks: a cover of "Dire Wolf" by Grateful Dead, a rendition of the traditional folk song "Cold Rain and Snow" and live versions of "Dooley's Farm" featuring Jerry Douglas and "Castelleja", both recorded at Nashville's Station Inn.

Track listing
Credits adapted from liner notes.

Personnel
Credits adapted from AllMusic.

Molly Tuttle - lead vocals, backing vocals, guitar, production

Golden Highway
Bronwyn Keith-Hynes - fiddle
Dominick Leslie - mandolin
Shelby Means - bass
Kyle Tuttle - banjo

Other musicians

Tina Adair - backing vocals
Darol Anger - fiddle
Ron Block - banjo, guitar, backing vocals
Mike Bub - upright bass
Jason Carter - fiddle
Jerry Douglas - dobro, backing vocals, production
Mike Harris - banjo
Sierra Hull - vocals, mandolin
Morgan Jahnig - upright bass
Viktor Krauss - upright bass
Lindsay Lou - backing vocals
Old Crow Medicine Show - backing vocals, various instruments
Jerry Pentecost - drums, backing vocals
Todd Phillips - upright bass
Margo Price - vocals
Christian Sedelmeyer - fiddle
Billy Strings - vocals, guitar
Jack Tuttle - vocals
Dan Tyminski - vocals
Mason Via - guitjo, mandolin, backing vocals
Melody Walker - backing vocals
Gillian Welch - vocals
Cory Younts - harmonica

Charts

Critical reception
At Metacritic, which assigns a normalized rating out of 100 to reviews from mainstream critics, the album has an average score of 80, based on 6 reviews, indicating "generally favorable reviews". It received a four star review from Neil Spencer at The Guardian, who stated that the album "looks destined to establish [Tuttle] with a wider audience" and praised the "heavyweight" guests such as Douglas, Welch and Old Crow, the "phenomenal" musicianship from Tuttle and the band and the "modern" interpretation of bluegrass.

References

2022 albums
Molly Tuttle albums